The Johnson House and Mill is a group of historically significant structures at 3906 Johnson Mill Boulevard in Johnson, Arkansas, USA. The house is a two-story brick building, fashioned from locally manufactured bricks, and the mill is a large -story wood-frame structure with a gable roof and large waterwheel at one end. The mill was built c. 1865-67 and the house in 1882, by Jacob Q. Johnson, the town's namesake. The complex was listed on the National Register of Historic Places. The mill building, which operated well into the 20th century, has been converted into a hotel.

See also
 Johnson Switch Building
 National Register of Historic Places listings in Washington County, Arkansas

References

External links

Inn at the Mill web site

Houses completed in 1882
Hotels in Arkansas
Grinding mills in Arkansas
National Register of Historic Places in Washington County, Arkansas
Houses on the National Register of Historic Places in Arkansas
Grinding mills on the National Register of Historic Places in Arkansas
Industrial buildings completed in 1867
1867 establishments in Arkansas
1882 establishments in Arkansas
Houses in Washington County, Arkansas